Ryu Si-won (born 6 October 1972) is a South Korean actor and singer. After he made his debut in the KBS drama Feeling in 1994, Ryu pursued a singing career.  He was convicted of stalking his wife (now ex wife) in 2013.

Early life
Ryu was born in Andong, North Gyeongsang Province, South Korea. He is from the Pungsan Ryu clan and is the 13th-generation descendant of Joseon Dynasty prime minister Yu Seong-ryong.

Career
Ryu’s acting career began in 1994 as a supporting actor in the TV series , produced by Yoon Seok-ho. Ryu was cast by virtue of Kim Hyeong-seok, who was in charge of the series’s music. The same year, he was cast as a leading role in the series , which aired in 1995. During this period, he also debuted as a musician, and hosted programs such as SBS’s TV Gayo 20 (the predecessor to Inkigayo) and KBS’s Music Bank.

Subsequent to the 2004 broadcast of his drama Beautiful Days in Japan, he started activities there both as an actor and a singer. He was the first Korean artist to hold two live concerts at the Tokyo Dome, in December 2008. Then in November 2011, he held his 100th solo concert in Japan as part of his 16 concert tour in eight cities, including Yokohama, Nigata, Osaka, Sendai, Nagoya, and Fukuoka; with the final concert on 21 December at Saitama Super Arena.

On 21 December 2011, Ryu was signed on by Japanese travel agency HIS, for one-year to promotion Korean tourism in Japan. Where he was featured in two 15-second commercials in the themes of "Let's go to Korea" and "You are the character of your drama" for Japanese television in January 2012.

In May 2012, Ryu starred in Channel A's drama Goodbye Dear Wife along with Hong Soo-hyun, Park Ji-yoon, Danny Ahn and Julien Kang. He played the role of judo teacher Cha Seung-hyuk who dreams of reuniting with his first love.

Television series 
 1994: Feelings (KBS)
 1995: The Campus Love Song (MBC)
 1995: Blue Sky (KBS)
 1996: 사랑할 때까지 (KBS)
 1996: 곰탕 (SBS)
 1997: 완벽한 남자를 만나는 방법 (KBS)
 1997: Propose (KBS)
 1997: 행복은 우리 가슴에 (SBS)
 1998: Paper Crane (KBS)
 1998: Purity (KBS)
 1998: To the End of the World (MBC)
 2000: Secret (MBC)
 2000: Truth (MBC)
 2001: Beautiful Days (SBS)
 2002: Since We Met (MBC)
 2002: The Shining Sunlight (MBC)
 2003: She's Cool! (KBS)
 2005: Koino Karasawagi Drama Special (Japan, NTV)
 2005: Wedding (KBS)
 2007: Joshideka (Japan, TBS)
 2007: Dondo Hare (Japan, NHK)
 2009: Ochaberi (Japan, TBS)
 2009: Style (SBS)
 2010: Hancho (Japan, TBS)
 2012: Goodbye Dear Wife (Channel A)

Discography

Japanese studio albums

Other Japanese albums

Korean albums 
 Change (November 1995)
 Dream (September 1999)
Re-released in Japan on 13 April 2005. Reached No. 35 with 12,000 copies sold.

Singles

Awards 
 1996 KBS Drama Awards: Best New Actor 
 1997 KBS Drama Awards: Popularity Award
 1998 KBS Drama Awards: Popularity Award
 1998 KBS Drama Awards: Excellence Award, actor 
 1999 16th Korea Best Dressed Awards: Recipient
 1999 35th Baeksang Arts Awards: Most Popular Actor in TV (Paper Crane)
 2000 MBC Drama Awards: Excellence Award, Actor (Truth)
 2001 SBS Drama Awards: Top 10 Stars (Beautiful Days)
 2002 MBC Drama Awards: Excellence Award, Actor 
 2005 47th Japan Record Awards: Most Popular Artist
 2005 19th Japan Gold Disc Awards: Best New Artist Award 
 2007 SBS Entertainment Awards: Special Award
 2007 Korea Model Awards: Hallyu Star Award
 2008 Presidential Citation

References

External links 
  

1972 births
K-pop singers
Living people
Dongguk University alumni
South Korean male television actors
South Korean television presenters
21st-century South Korean  male singers
Ryu clan of Pungsan